Nicky Doll is the stage name of Karl Sanchez (born 14 March 1991), a French drag queen based in New York City, known for being a competitor on the twelfth season of RuPaul's Drag Race ultimately placing 10th.

Since 2022, Nicky Doll has been a judge and the main host of Drag Race France.

Early life 
Sanchez was born in Marseille, France, but also travelled quite a bit as a child, living in St. Martin and Morocco.

Career 
Sanchez trained to be a makeup artist. He created his drag persona in 2009 and has modelled extensively as Nicky Doll, appearing on the pages of Féroce Magazine, Cosmopolitan and Volition Magazine among others. Sanchez grew his drag persona by himself, he does not have a drag mother, nor does he belong to any drag family. Her drag name “Nicky” is a tribute to Nicki Minaj and “Doll” is because she has different personalities hence she wanted a little bit of versatility to her name. He describes Nicky Doll as a self-described 90’s life-size doll.

Sanchez's appearance on season 12 of RuPaul’s Drag Race was announced on January 23, 2020. He is the first French contestant on the US version of the show. Sanchez was described as a ‘look queen’ and has spoken openly about “deep insecurities when it comes to the language barrier” that he experienced during the show. He made attempts to change that impression by applying silly makeup and hamming it up as the baby in the Gay’s Anatomy acting challenge.

Ultimately it wasn’t enough and he was eliminated at the end of episode 5. During his time on the show, Sanchez was in the top once, and in the bottom two times. He successfully lip-synced for his life against Dahlia Sin in episode 3, to Problem by Ariana Grande featuring Iggy Azalea. In episode 5, he was unsuccessful in his performance against Heidi N Closet to the song "Heart to Break" by Kim Petras. As a result of his appearance on Drag Race, Sanchez was hand-picked by RuPaul to do Pete Davidson's makeup for a pre-recorded sketch on an episode of Saturday Night Live which was hosted by RuPaul.

In March 2022, Nicky Doll was announced as the host of Drag Race France. The first season of Drag Race France premiered on June 25, 2022.

Personal life 
Sanchez came out as gay at the age of 18. He relocated from Paris to San Francisco in 2015, before moving to New York in 2017.

Filmography

Television

Web series

Discography

Featured singles

References

External links

1991 births
Living people
Drag Race France
Entertainers from Marseille
French drag queens
French gay artists
French make-up artists
Gay entertainers
People from New York City
Nicky Doll